Turner Joy can refer to:

 C. Turner Joy (1895-1956), U.S. admiral
 USS Turner Joy (DD-951), a destroyer in United States Navy